Soul Clap (also labeled as Showbiz & A.G.) is the debut extended play by American underground hip hop duo Showbiz and A.G. It was self-released in 1991 via their own independent record label Showbiz Records; and re-released on March 17, 1992 though London/Payday Records after signing a record deal. Production was handled by Showbiz and Diamond D. It features guest appearances from Lord Finesse and Diamond D on the posse cut "Diggin' in the Crates", which later became the name of hip hop collective D.I.T.C. Songs "Party Groove", "Soul Clap" and "Catchin' Wreck" later was featured on the duo's debut LP Runaway Slave.

Track listing

Personnel
Rodney "Showbiz" LeMay – main artist
Andre "A.G." Barnes – main artist
Joseph "Diamond D" Kirkland – producer (track 3), vocals (track 6)
Robert "Lord Finesse" Hall – vocals (track 6)
Christopher "DJ Premier" Martin – scratches (track 8)
Chris Conway – engineering
Gary Buchman – engineering
John "Jazzy Jay" Bayas – engineering
Tony Dawsey – mastering
Alli Truch – art direction

References

External links

1992 debut EPs
Showbiz and A.G. albums
Albums produced by Diamond D
Albums produced by Showbiz (producer)